Selišče may refer to the following places in Slovenia:
Selišče, Dolenjske Toplice, a village in the Municipality of Dolenjske Toplice
Selišče, Tolmin, a village in the Municipality of Tolmin